KTDB (89.7 FM), is a National Public Radio-affiliated station in Ramah, New Mexico. It is the first Native American owned and operated radio station. It primarily features National Public Radio programming and Native American programming.

The general manager is Barbara Maria, program director is Irene Beaver, chief engineer is Bernard Bustos, technical director is Timothy Sarver, and the producers are Earl Eriacho, Walter Jose, and Olsen Pino. The radio station is located in Pine Hill, NM on the Ramah Navajo Nation. The Ramah Community population is approximately 3,000 Navajo members. The radio tower is located on Flat Top mountain.

Ramah Navajo, according to oral and written histories have lived in this area for hundreds of years. Traditional values have been blended with innovative progress while emphasizing the distinct cultural identity if the Tlochini Dine'e (People of the Wild Onion), known to the outside world as the Ramah Navajo People. Ramah Navajos have always lived in this area long before the Long Walk.

External links
 NPR official website

Native American radio
KTDB
TDB
Radio stations established in 1974
TDB
Navajo mass media
Ramah Navajo Indian Reservation